Chamran (also Romanized as Chamrān; also known as Chamram, Chamarom, Chamarūm and Chatram) is a village in Aq Kahriz Rural District, Nowbaran District, Saveh County, Markazi Province, Iran. At the 2006 census, its population was 441, in 124 families.

References 

Populated places in Saveh County